João Carlos Ferreira (born 24 August 1980) is a Luxembourgian footballer. A midfielder, he played twenty times for the Luxembourg national football team.

Club career

Ferreira began his career in 2000 playing for Etzella Ettelbruck. In the same season he won the 2000–01 Luxembourg Cup.
 In 2014 Ferreira joined Feulen.

International career 

Ferreira first played for Luxembourg in a defeat against Latvia in 2005 and went on to earn twenty caps.

Honours

Luxembourg Cup: 1
2000–01

References

1980 births
Living people
Luxembourgian footballers
Luxembourg international footballers
Association football midfielders
FC Etzella Ettelbruck players
People from Ettelbruck